This is a List of telephony terminology and acronyms which relate to telephony networks.

A
Advanced Intelligent Network, (AIN), see also IN or Intelligent Network
Automatic number announcement circuit (ANAC)
Automated Attendant
ACD - Automatic call distributor
Articulation score

B
Blue box - a device that was used to bypass the normal long-distance call switching tones typically used to obtain free calls.

C
Call originator - (or calling party, caller or A-party) a person or device that initiates a telephone call by dialling a telephone number.
Call waiting - a system that notifies a caller of another incoming telephone call by sounding a sound in the earpiece.
Called party - (or callee or B-party)
Caller
Calling party
Conference call (multi-party call)
COCOT

D
Dial peer
Dial tone
Distribution frame
Dual-tone multi-frequency signaling (DTMF)

E
Emergency telephone number
End instrument
Engset calculation
Erlang unit

F
Fax - (contraction of facsimile) a device connected to the telephone network to enable documents to be scanned and sent to a receiving fax machine
Frame - A distribution frame, a set of open wiring racks where circuits are cross connected to trunks and equipment

H
Handoff
Handover
Help desk
Howler tone (see ROH tone)
Hunt Group

I
Infrastructure
Intelligent Network (IN)
Interface functionality
Inside plant
Intelligent Network Interface Device (iNID) - replaces the Network Interface Device outside a subscriber's house like when customers subscribe to AT&T's U-verse brand of services.
Interactive voice response (IVR)
ISDN User Part (ISUP)

L
Line
Local loop
Long-distance operator

O
On-premises wiring
Operator assistance
Outside plant

P
Patch-through access
Permanent signal
Person-to-person
Plain old telephone service, or "POTS"
Public Switched Telephone Network (PSTN)
Pupinization

R
Receiver Off-Hook tone (ROH)
Red telephone box
Red box
Regional Bell Operating Company (RBOC)
Ringer equivalency number (REN)
Ringing signal
Rural radio service

S
Smartphone
Station-to-station
Signalling System 7 (SS7)

T
Tandem signaling
Tandem switch
Transaction Capabilities Application Part (TCAP)
Telemarketing
Telephone
Telephone booth
Telephone call
Telephone card
Telephone directory
Telephone exchange
Telephone tapping
Teletraffic engineering
Time Division Multiplexing (TDM)
Trap and trace
TWX

V
Vertical service code
Voicemail
Voice over Internet Protocol (VoIP)

W
Western Union
Wide Area Telephone Service (WATS)
WATS line
Wireless network
Wireless Telephony Applications Interface (WTAI)
Wi-Fi

Z
Zenith number

Acronyms

Technical terminology
Telephony